Tom Conroy is a New Zealand rugby league footballer who represented New Zealand in the 1975 World Cup.

Playing career
Conroy played for the Ponsonby Ponies in the Auckland Rugby League competition. He won the Lipscombe Cup as sportsman of the year in 1973. He represented Auckland, including against the touring Great Britain Lions in 1974 and against France in 1981.

Conroy played in eight tests for the New Zealand national rugby league team during the 1975 World Cup.

References

Living people
Year of birth missing (living people)
New Zealand rugby league players
New Zealand national rugby league team players
Auckland rugby league team players
Ponsonby Ponies players
Rugby league hookers